The Gold Coast along with British Togoland, now known as Ghana, competed at the 1952 Summer Olympics in Helsinki, Finland. Seven competitors, all men, took part in five events in one sport. It was the first appearance of the West African nation, which didn't win a medal at its debut.

Results by event

Athletics
Men's 100 metres
 Gabriel Laryea
 Round 1 — 11.1 s (→ 3rd in heat, did not advance)
 George Acquaah
 Round 1 — 11.2 s (→ 5th in heat, did not advance)

Men's 800 metres
 Mohamed Sanni-Thomas
 Round 1 — 2:05.8 min (→ 6th in heat, did not advance)

Men's 4x100 metres relay
 Gabriel Laryea, George Acquaah, John Owusu, Augustus Lawson
 Round 1 — 42.1 s (→ 4th in heat, did not advance)

Men's high jump
 James Owoo
 Qualification — 187 cm (→ advanced to the final)
 Final — 180 cm (→ 20th place)

Men's triple jump
 William Laing
 Qualification — 14.09 m (→ did not advance)

References

Nations at the 1952 Summer Olympics
1952
1952 in Gold Coast (British colony)